Chikhladze is a Georgian surname. Notable people with the surname include:

Anzor Chikhladze (born 1949), Russian professional football coach and a former player
Lado Chikhladze (born 1985), Georgian former professional tennis player
Sandro Chikhladze (born 1965), Soviet equestrian
Shalva Chikhladze (1912–1997), Soviet light-heavyweight wrestler from Georgia

Surnames of Georgian origin
Georgian-language surnames